Horticultural oils or narrow range oils are lightweight oils, either petroleum or vegetable based. They are used in both horticulture and agriculture, where they are applied as a dilute spray on plant surfaces to control insects and mites. They are also sometimes included in tank mixes as a surfactant.

The oils provide control by smothering the target pests, and are only effective if applied directly to the pest, and provide no residual controls.

Oils are generally considered suitable for "organic pest control", with most oils permitted under the U.S. National Organic Program.

Types of oils
Dormant oil: An oil used on woody plants during the dormant season. This term originally referred to heavier weight, less well-refined oils that were unsafe to use on plants after they broke dormancy. However, these older oils have been replaced with more refined, light-weight oils that have potential application to plant foliage. Dormant oil now refers to the time of application rather than to any characteristic type of oil.

Horticultural oils: An oil used to control a pest on plants.

Mineral oil: A petroleum-derived oil (as opposed to vegetable oils).

Narrow-range oil: A highly refined oil that has a narrow range of distillation. Narrow-range oils fall in the superior oil classification. The terms may be used nearly interchangeably.

Spray oil: An oil designed to be mixed with water and applied to plants as a spray for pest control.

Summer oil: An oil used on plants when foliage is present (also called foliar oils). As with dormant oil, the term now refers to the time an application is made rather than to the properties of the oil.

Supreme oil: A term used to categorize highly refined oils that distill at slightly higher temperatures and over a wider range than the narrow-range oils. Most supreme oils meet the characteristics of a superior oil.

Superior oil: A term originated by P.J. Chapman in 1947 to categorize summer-use oils that met certain specifications. This included a high proportion of paraffinic hydrocarbons and purification that allowed year-round use without phytotoxicity. Since then, further developments have resulted in oils that distill over a narrow temperature range. Most superior oils are now better referred to as narrow-range oils.

Vegetable oil: An oil derived from the seeds of some oil seed crop (e.g., soybeans, canola, cottonseed).

See also

References

 Using Horticultural Oil Sprays for Pest Control | Horticulture and Home Pest News Iowa State University Extension and Outreach.
 "Early insect control with horticultural oils." MSU Extension.

External links
 Insect Control: Horticultural Oils

Oils
Horticulture